Pseudoliotia acidalia is a species of small sea snail, a marine gastropod mollusk, in the family Tornidae.

Distribution
This marine species occurs off Queensland and the Northern Territories, Australia.

References

 Laseron, C., 1958. Liotiidae and allied molluscs from the Dampierian Zoogeographical Province. Rec. Aust. Mus, 24(11):165-182.

External links
 To World Register of Marine Species

Tornidae
Gastropods described in 1899